A urethral sling is a device that is surgically implanted to stabilize the pelvic tissues and organs of women. The surgery that implants this device can help treat urinary incontinence and uterine prolapse. An alternative treatment to the placement of the urethral sling is urethral bulking injections.

References 

Urology
Incontinence
Surgical procedures and techniques